Fritz Reuter Leiber Sr. (January 31, 1882 – October 14, 1949) was an American actor. A Shakespearean actor on stage, he also had a successful career in film. He was the father of science fiction and fantasy writer Fritz Leiber Jr., who was also an actor for a time.

Life
Leiber was born in Chicago, the son of Meta (Klett) and Albrecht Leiber. His father was from Baden Baden and his mother was from Mecklenburg. Leiber was based in Chicago for most of his pre-Hollywood career. He married Virginia Bronson (1885–1970), who like him was a Shakespearean performer. Leiber died, in the Hollywood neighborhood of Los Angeles, from a heart attack at the age of 67.

Career

Leiber and his wife spent much of their time touring in a Shakespearian acting company, known by the 1930s as Fritz Leiber & Co. Leiber made his film bow in 1916, playing Mercutio in the Francis X. Bushman version of Romeo and Juliet. With his piercing eyes and shock of white hair, Leiber seemed every inch the priests, professors, musical professors, and religious fanatics that he was frequently called upon to play in films. His many silent-era portrayals included Caesar in Theda Bara's 1917 Cleopatra and Solomon in the mammoth 1921 Betty Blythe vehicle The Queen of Sheba.

He thrived as a character actor in sound films, usually in historical roles. In the film Champagne Waltz, he portrayed an orchestra maestro; the role required him to play classical music on a violin and jazz on a clarinet. One of Leiber's larger assignments of the 1940s, and his most notable musical role, was as Franz Liszt in the Claude Rains remake of Phantom of the Opera (1943).

Leiber appears together with his son Fritz Leiber, Jr. in the wedding-feast scene of Greta Garbo's film Camille (1936) and in Warner Bros.' The Great Garrick (1937). Leiber also appeared with his son Fritz Leiber, Jr. in The Hunchback of Notre Dame (1939) but Fritz Leiber, Jr. was not credited for his small speaking part.

 
Late in his career, Leiber performed briefly opposite Charles Chaplin as the priest who visits Monsieur Verdoux in his prison cell.

Portrait collection
For most or all of his long acting career, Leiber had a hobby: each time he performed a new role, he had his likeness or portrait made in costume and make-up for that role. Since Leiber was not an especially protean actor, he tended to look the same in every part: therefore, to bring some variety to his portrait collection, he varied the format and media of each likeness: one was a full-length oil painting, another a charcoal sketch of his upper body; one a sculpted bust, one a clay bas-relief, and so forth. After the actor's death, all of his surviving portraits passed to his son, Fritz Leiber Jr., who found himself in the awkward situation of sharing a cramped residence with more than two hundred copies of his father's face; Leiber Jr. later used this experience as the basis of his 1963 story "237 Talking Statues, Etc." The two Fritz Leibers also physically resembled each other enough to give casual visitors the impression that the portraits were of Leiber Jr. himself.

Filmography

Romeo and Juliet (1916) .... Mercutio
 The Primitive Call (1917) .... Brain Elkhorn
Cleopatra (1917) .... Caesar
If I Were King (1920) .... Louis XI
The Song of the Soul (1920) .... Jerry Wendover
The Queen of Sheba (1921) .... King Solomon
A Tale of Two Cities (1935) .... Gaspard
The Story of Louis Pasteur (1936) .... Dr. Charbonnet
Under Two Flags (1936) .... French Governor
Hearts in Bondage (1936) .... Capt. John Ericsson
Down to the Sea (1936) .... Gregory Pappas
Sins of Man (1936) .... Father Prior
Anthony Adverse (1936) .... Ouvrard
Champagne Waltz (1937) .... Franz Strauss
Under Southern Stars (1937, Short) .... Stonewall Jackson
The Prince and the Pauper (1937) .... Father Andrew
The Great Garrick (1937) .... Horatio
The Jury's Secret (1938) .... John Morrow
Flight into Nowhere (1938) .... Ti-Ana
Gateway (1938) .... Dr. Weilander
They Made Her a Spy (1939) .... Dr. Krull
Nurse Edith Cavell (1939) .... Sadi Kirschen
Pack Up Your Troubles (1939) .... Pierre Ferrand
The Hunchback of Notre Dame (1939) .... Old Nobleman
The Way of All Flesh (1940) .... Max
The Sea Hawk (1940) .... Inquisitor
All This, and Heaven Too (1940) .... Abbe Gallard
Lady with Red Hair (1940) .... Mr. Foster
Aloma of the South Seas (1941) .... High Priest
Crossroads (1942) .... Foreign Minister Deval (uncredited)
First Comes Courage (1943) .... Dr. Aanrud
Salute to the Marines (1943) .... Mr. Agno (uncredited)
Phantom of the Opera (1943) .... Franz Liszt
The Desert Song (1943) .... Ben Sidi (uncredited)
The Impostor (1944) .... Priest
Cobra Woman (1944) .... Venreau (uncredited)
Cry of the Werewolf (1944) .... Dr. Charles Morris
Youth Runs Wild (1944) .... Judge (uncredited)
The Cisco Kid Returns (The Daring Adventurer) (1945) .... The Padre
Son of Lassie (1945) .... Village Padre (uncredited)
The Spanish Main (1945) .... Bishop
This Love of Ours (1945) .... Dr. Bailey
Scarlet Street (1945) .... Evangelist (uncredited)
A Scandal in Paris (1946) .... Painter
Angel on My Shoulder (1946) .... Chemist Who Poisoned Wife (uncredited)
Strange Journey (1946) .... Prof. Jenner
Humoresque (1946) .... Hagerstrom
Monsieur Verdoux (1947) .... Father Fareaux
Bells of San Angelo (1947) .... Padre
Dangerous Venture (1947) .... Xeoli
The Web (1947) .... Leopold Kroner
High Conquest (1947) .... Priest
Adventures of Casanova (1948) .... D'Anneci
To the Ends of the Earth (1948) .... Binda Sha
Another Part of the Forest (1948) .... Colonel Isham
Inner Sanctum (1948) .... Dr. Valonius
Song of India (1949) .... Nanaram
Bride of Vengeance (1949) .... Filippo
Bagdad (1949) .... Emir
Samson and Delilah (1949) .... Lord Sharif
Devil's Doorway (1950) .... Mr. Poole (final film role)

References

External links

 
 
 

1882 births
1949 deaths
American male stage actors
Male actors from Chicago
20th-century American male actors
Burials at Forest Lawn Memorial Park (Glendale)
American male film actors
American people of German descent